Stethorus punctum, known generally as the spider mite destroyer or black mite destroyer, is a species of lady beetle in the family Coccinellidae. It is found in North America.

Subspecies
These two subspecies belong to the species Stethorus punctum:
 Stethorus punctum picipes Casey, 1899
 Stethorus punctum punctum (LeConte, 1852)

References

Further reading

 

Coccinellidae
Beetles of North America
Beetles described in 1852
Taxa named by John Lawrence LeConte
Articles created by Qbugbot